Withcall railway station was a station in Withcall, Lincolnshire, England.

History 

Withcall railway station was the second station west of Louth on this line.

Passenger services ended on 5 November 1951, goods traffic on 17 December 1956.

Route

References

Disused railway stations in Lincolnshire
Former Great Northern Railway stations
Railway stations in Great Britain opened in 1882
Railway stations in Great Britain closed in 1951